Jean Hubert (12 June 1902 – 1 July 1994) was a 20th-century French art historian, specializing in religious architecture.

The son and grandsons of chartists, Jean Hubert himself became a student at the École Nationale des Chartes where he supported in 1925 a thesis entituled L'abbaye Notre–Dame de Déols (917–1627) which earned him the degree of archivist paleographer.

He became director of the Departmental Archives of Seine-et-Marne in 1926 and held this position until 1955. 

He then succeeded Marcel Aubert in the chair of medieval archeology at the École des Chartes (1955–1973).<ref>[http://www.persee.fr/web/revues/home/prescript/article/bec_0373-6237_1995_num_153_2_450793 Nécrologie dans la Bibliothèque de l'École des chartes]</ref>

Jean Hubert was elected a member of the Académie des inscriptions et belles-lettres in 1963. He was also a member of the Société des Antiquaires de France.

 Main publications 
His bibliography includes 308 items including

1967: L'Europe des invasions, with Jean Porcher and Wolfgang Fritz Volbach, Éditions Gallimard, series L'Univers des formes.
1968: L'Empire carolingien, with Jean Porcher and Wolfgang Fritz Volbach, Gallimard, series L'Univers des formes, 1968.
1985: L'Abbatiale Notre Dame de Déols''

References

External links 
 Jean Hubert on data.bnf.fr

1902 births
1994 deaths
People from Indre
École Nationale des Chartes alumni
French art historians
Members of the Académie des Inscriptions et Belles-Lettres
Commandeurs of the Ordre des Palmes Académiques
Officiers of the Légion d'honneur